K. Ravindranathan Nair , a.k.a. Achani Ravi or General Pictures Ravi, is an Indian film producer of Malayalam films, industrialist and philanthropist, known for a number of critically acclaimed movies he has produced such as Kanchana Sita, Thampu, Kummatty, Esthappan, Pokkuveyil, Elippathayam, Manju, Mukhamukham, Anantaram and Vidheyan. Nair is credited with fostering the art film movement in Malayalam cinema during the period from the seventies till the nineties. A multiple recipient of National and State film awards, Nair was awarded the J. C. Daniel Award by the Government of Kerala, in 2008, for his contributions to Malayalam cinema.

Biography
K. Ravindran Nair was born in a rich family, dealing with cashew production and exports. His passion for literature and arts brought him into Malayalam cinema and in 1967, he established General Pictures under the banner of which he produced his first movie, Anweshichu Kandethiyilla, directed by P. Bhaskaran. This was followed by two more films the next year, Kattukurangu and Lakshaprabhu, both directed by Bhaskaran. Ravi, as he is generally known, was silent for the next few years till he came out with his next film, Achani, an A. Vincent movie, in 1973, which earned him the moniker, Achani Ravi. The film was reported to be a commercial success like his earlier films and Ravi is known to have contributed the returns from the movie for building a Public Library in Kollam, of which he is a founder member and honorary secretary.

The year 1977 marked a new chapter in Nair's life with the first of his films with the renowned filmmaker G. Aravindan, Kanchana Sita releasing that year. This was followed by four more Aravindan films, Thampu (1978), Kummatty (1979), Esthappan (1979) and Pokkuveyil (1981). The next film he produced, Elippathayam (1981), was directed by Adoor Gopalakrishnan. Three more films, Mukhamukham (1984), Anantaram (1987) and Vidheyan (1993), with the same director were released in the ensuing years. In between, he also produced a film, Manju (1982) for the Jnanpith and National Film award winner, M. T. Vasudevan Nair.

Nair produced a total of 14 films for which he received 18 awards before he retired from cinema. Usha Ravi, Ravindran Nair's wife, was a playback singer having sung in movies such as Thampu, Aambal poovu and Detective 909. Usha died on 2 October 2013, leaving Nair and three of their children, Prathap, Preetha and Prakash.

Filmography

See also

 G. Aravindan
 Adoor Gopalakrishnan
 M. T. Vasudevan Nair
 P. Bhaskaran
 A. Vincent

References

Further reading

External links
 

Year of birth missing (living people)
Living people
J. C. Daniel Award winners
Kerala State Film Award winners
Businesspeople from Kollam
Indian philanthropists
Malayali people
Film producers from Kerala
Malayalam film producers
Indian humanitarians
20th-century Indian businesspeople